Per Thomas Håkansson (born 19 October 1957) is a Swedish and Canadian curler, a  and two-time Swedish men's champion (1976, 1980).

His team won the 1976 Sweden men's championship, but it was decided that the team members were too young for the World Championship, so team Bengt Cederwall (skip) went to the  instead.

He would later move to Canada, and played in the 1985 and 1988 Labatt Brier for Nova Scotia.

Awards
Ross Harstone Sportsmanship Award:

Teams

Personal life
Håkansson is a member of a family of curlers.

References

External links

Living people
1957 births
Swedish male curlers
Swedish curling champions
Canadian male curlers
Curlers from Nova Scotia
Swedish expatriate sportspeople in Canada